Lorelai Victoria Gilmore is a fictional character in The WB dramedy television series Gilmore Girls. Portrayed by actress Lauren Graham, she appeared in every episode of the show from the pilot in 2000 to the series finale in 2007.

Lorelai is introduced as a young single mother of a teenage daughter, Rory. Lorelai has a strained relationship with her wealthy parents, Richard and Emily, after running away as a teen to raise her daughter on her own. Lorelai remains estranged from her parents for many years, until the events of the pilot episode, where she asks her parents for help with paying Rory's tuition. Her parents agree, on the condition that she visits them for dinner every Friday.

Besides an on-again, off-again relationship with Rory's father, Christopher Hayden, Lorelai had a few romantic relationships that included Max Medina, a teacher at Rory's school, Chilton, to whom she was briefly engaged; Alex Lesman, an outdoorsy coffee house entrepreneur; Jason Stiles, a childhood acquaintance, and Luke Danes, the owner of Luke's Diner in her adopted hometown, Stars Hollow. As Lorelai frequented Luke's Diner, they grew to be close friends and eventually fell in love. In the Netflix revival miniseries A Year in the Life, Luke and Lorelai married. 

Graham received widespread critical acclaim for portraying her character, and was nominated for several awards. She was nominated for two Screen Actors Guild Awards in 2000 and 2001, and a Golden Globe Award in 2001. Graham also won two Teen Choice Awards for her role. Lorelai is often included on lists of "top TV moms".

Arc

Background
Lorelai Victoria Gilmore was born to Richard and Emily Gilmore on April 25, 1968. Named after her paternal grandmother, Lorelai was raised in Hartford, Connecticut by wealthy parents who wanted her to be a proper young lady of high society, go to an Ivy League college, and marry a man with wealth and status. Her early life was complicated by the high expectations of an overbearing mother and workaholic father, both parents wanted their daughter to fulfill the aspirations of their world of privilege. As a teenager, she discovered she was pregnant with her boyfriend Christopher's baby. Her parents discovered her pregnancy during a fitting for her debutante dress. This greatly embarrassed and disappointed her parents as well as the parents of Christopher, Straub, and Francine Hayden. Straub Hayden initially suggested that Lorelai have an abortion, however, Emily would not allow this, and Richard suggested that Lorelai and Christopher should marry instead. Christopher agreed, but Lorelai refused, convinced that marrying so young simply wouldn't work out. When Lorelai realized she was in labor, she left a note for her parents and drove alone to the hospital. After giving birth to her daughter, Rory, on October 8, 1984 at the age of 16, Lorelai lived with her parents at their mansion in Hartford briefly before running away to Stars Hollow, a small fictional town in rural Connecticut, to find her own life. The owner of the Independence Inn, Mia, gave Lorelai a job as a maid, and let her and Rory live in the back in a renovated potting shed. The Independence Inn is where she met her best friend, Sookie St. James, who was executive chef at the Independence Inn. Lorelai worked her way up over the years and was eventually promoted to executive management, which is her job as the show opens. For many years after running away from home, Lorelai had almost no contact with her parents, except for visits during major holidays.

Storylines
When the series starts, Rory gets accepted into Chilton Preparatory School, a private and expensive high school. In order to pay the attendance fees, Lorelai goes as a last choice to Emily and Richard who agree to loan the money. In exchange for paying for Rory's tuition at Chilton, Emily and Richard instate mandatory "Friday night dinners" to which Lorelai reluctantly agrees, which allows them to get to know their granddaughter. Lorelai meets Rory's teacher Max Medina (Scott Cohen) at Rory's first parent-teacher meeting in Chilton. They both become interested in one another and soon start seeing each other. When Lorelai wants to split as it becomes too serious, she kisses Max in Chilton, which provokes a scandal in the school and puts an end to their relationship. While they are separate, Lorelai has a one-night stand with Christopher (David Sutcliffe) after a heated argument with her parents. Christopher proposes to her, but she rejects him telling him he is not ready to take care of Rory and her. Lorelai later rekindles her relationship with Max and they become engaged. As their wedding is approaching, Lorelai has second thoughts and calls Christopher during her bachelorette party. Suddenly, Lorelai calls off the wedding and decides to go on a road-trip with Rory during which they visit Harvard University.

Christopher comes back to town for Rory's debutante ball. During the evening, Lorelai and Christopher share a kiss as she finds him changed, but he tells her he is now in a serious relationship with a woman named Sherry. Afterward, Lorelai and Sookie make plans about opening their Inn, but the building they want, Fran Weston's inn 'the Dragonfly', is not for sale. When Luke Danes (Scott Patterson)'s nephew Jess Mariano (Milo Ventimiglia) and Rory get into a car accident, Lorelai blames Jess which leads to a serious argument between Luke and Lorelai. They reconcile only months later. Christopher returns to Stars Hollow and after he tells Lorelai he has problems in his relationship with Sherry, they spend the night together before Sookie's wedding. They are both now ready to commit, but when Christopher learns Sherry is pregnant, he leaves Lorelai and returns to Sherry. In the third season, Lorelai then meets Alex Lesman (Billy Burke) at a lecture about inns and they begin dating. While she is on her way to the Friday night dinner, Lorelai comes across Max and they catch up. They again run into each other at Chilton's bicentennial and share a kiss. After several days, the two meet at a Chilton's parent committee evening and Max makes it clear he does not want them to reunite. On Lorelai's birthday, Richard gives her payout from an investment he had made at her birth, however she decides to repay her parents for the loan, which shocks Emily. Fran dies which gives the possibility to Lorelai and Sookie to buy the Dragonfly. The Independence Inn closes and Lorelai plans on using the money aimed for the Dragonfly to pay for Yale University's fees, however, Rory refuses to let her pay for Yale and instead asks her grandparents for their financial help, reinstating in return the Friday night dinners. This then allows Lorelai and Sookie to buy the Dragonfly on Rory's graduation day.

In the fourth season, Luke marries lawyer Nicole on a cruise but they soon divorce and Lorelai and Sookie begin the renovations of the inn. Richard forms a new partnership with his former associate's son, Jason Stiles (Chris Eigeman) who happens to be an old camp friend of Lorelai. After he has a disagreement with Emily about Richard's new business launch party, Lorelai furious goes to talk to him and at the end of their discussion he invites her to dinner but she refuses. Later on, Jason succeeds into getting invited by Emily to a Friday night dinner and he and Lorelai get closer. She eventually accepts his invitation to dinner and start seeing each other without telling her parents. As she is running out of money to renovate the inn, Lorelai asks Luke's help who offers her a loan. When Emily organizes a dinner with Jason's parents, Jason's father Floyd announces he is going to sue his son and Richard because they have taken his clients. Floyd also tells Lorelai's parents about her relationship with his son, which shocks Emily. In the fallout of Floyd's announcement, Richard decides to associate with Floyd jeopardizing Jason's career. When the former tells her he will sue her father, Lorelai breaks up with him. Luke whose marriage to lawyer Nicole failed, finally realizes the woman he truly loves is Lorelai. She serves as a date for his sister's wedding and sees him under a new light. At the end of the evening he tells her they should spend more time together. Lorelai and Sookie open their inn and after a misunderstanding about Jason, Luke and Lorelai finally kiss for the first time.

In the fifth season, Lorelai embarks on a relationship with Luke and after she discovers Rory has lost her virginity to married Dean, who was her first love and former boyfriend. Dean had married another girl, after breaking up with Rory. This entanglement with a married man strains Rory and Lorelai's mother-daughter relationship. Eventually Rory apologizes. Christopher panicking over Sherrie's departure to Paris, leaving him alone with their baby, calls Lorelai for help. Rory later tells Christopher to leave her mother alone. After no news following her visit to his house, she invites Christopher to the inn with Rory and notices the tension between them. Luke also worries when he learns about the dinner. When Christopher's father dies, Lorelai and Rory go at his house to support him. However, Lorelai does not mention her visit to Luke. Emily tells Christopher that the relationship between Lorelai and Luke is getting serious and that he should do something if he wants to end up with Lorelai. At Richard and Emily's wedding renewal ceremony, Lorelai finally admits to Luke her visit to Christopher when she notices his presence. Christopher tells Luke that his relationship with Lorelai won't last because he is destined to be with Lorelai. This leads to Luke breaking up with Lorelai but they later reunite. Lorelai, however, remains furious at Emily for some time and eventually forgives her. Lorelai is worried about Rory's relationship with Logan Huntzberger (Matt Czuchry) and his family's influence on her. At the conclusion of the season, they steal a yacht and end up at the police station. Rory decides to take a year off from Yale which upsets Lorelai and when her parents, who initially agreed to help, change their mind and permit Rory to move in with them, prompts Lorelai to propose to Luke.

In the sixth season, Lorelai and Rory do not talk for months while Luke agrees to marry Lorelai and they renovate her house. When Luke reveals he cannot trust Lorelai after she has received a message from Christopher, the two fight. Lorelai and Rory finally reconcile and she decides to return to Yale. Luke learns he has a daughter but does not tell Lorelai. Lorelai later finds out about Luke's daughter and they decide to postpone the wedding. When Christopher receives an inheritance, he starts to pay for Yale and the Friday night dinners aren't so mandatory anymore. After posing an ultimatum to Luke which leads to their break-up, Lorelai finds comfort in Christopher and they start dating again.

In the final season of the original series, Lorelai and Christopher jet off to Paris, where they impulsively get married. When Lorelai returns home and informs Rory and the rest of Stars Hollow, including Luke that she and Christopher are married she gets mixed reactions. Rory is upset at first, but comes around since she all she really wants is her mom (and for that matter her dad) to be happy. Throughout the season, Christopher and Lorelai face some significant problems, the biggest one is when Lorelai needs to write a character reference for Luke so he can partial custody of his daughter, April. Christopher finds a draft of the letter and when reading it, he realizes that Lorelai still loves Luke. Lorelai tries to deny it, but they both soon realize that they're better off as friends. In the end, Lorelai reunites with Luke. She realizes how much she loves Luke when she finds out that he was the one who planned Rory's goodbye party for the entire town. Lorelai realizes that Luke has been there for her from the beginning and loves her and her daughter. In one of the final scenes of the show, Lorelai and Luke share a passionate kiss and get back together, finally ready to settle into a stable relationship.

In 2016 Netflix revival of the show, Lorelai and Luke have built a life together. They are living together in her home, he still runs the diner and she still owns her inn, but they have not married. Throughout the four episodes, Lorelai goes through a lot, especially with her relationship with her mother. Lorelai and Emily always had a strained relationship yet over the years it had gotten better. In the revival, the two go to family therapy. Lorelai also goes on her own version of "Wild" where she tries to find herself. When she returns, she realizes her life is with Luke in Stars Hollow and she's happy. The show ends with Lorelai and Luke's wedding in the center of Stars Hollow at dawn with some of her closest friends, Michel, Lane, Kirk and Rory.

In the very last scene of the show, Lorelai sits with Rory as they reflect on 'it all'. Suddenly, Rory turns to her mother and tells her she is pregnant.

Character development

Casting

Three other actresses, including Nina Garbiras, were initially considered to play Lorelai, but the network rejected them and instead mentioned the name of Lauren Graham. Before landing the role of Lorelai in Gilmore Girls, Graham starred in many short-lived TV shows, guest appeared in a number of top 10 prime-time comedies and did commercial work.

She obtained the role in Gilmore Girls because she had all the characteristics producer Amy Sherman-Palladino was looking for. "The fact that you had someone that talented running around Hollywood, not found yet, was the biggest coup in the world", she said "Because Lorelai's a hard part. You've got to be funny, you've got to talk really fast, you've got to be able to act, you've got to be sexy, but not scary sexy. You've got to be strong, but not like 'I hate men.' It's a lot that goes into this character, and it was really a tough find. And to find it and be able to feel like you broke somebody fresh, even though everybody in town knew Lauren, like everybody here was like, 'When is Lauren going to get something great.' But America didn't know Lauren, and that was a real coup for us."

Characterization 
Virginia Heffernan of The New York Times described Lorelai and Rory as "unsentimental brainiacs" who, if they could see Gilmore Girls, would hate its sentimentality of the last and final season. She talks fast and uses words to keep her "loneliness at bay" which, while opinion, seems to be a relatively insightful view of her. Lorelai feels that to "swoon, even once," would make her lose her verbal power and her "reason for being." On the characteristic of talking fast, Sherman-Palladino noted: "Just by listening to Lorelai's vocal patterns, it says volumes about this woman: First of all, that she's bright enough to put that many words together that quickly... and it says a lot about her emotionally, that she's got a deflection shield that's sort of the way she gets through the world, which says survivor." She also said of the character: "Lorelai's humor was her guard and her deflection and what kept her strong. It was her Wonder Woman cuffs."

Margaret Lyons of Vulture.com wrote an analysis on Lorelai pointing out her flaws: "Both Gilmores have an exaggerated sense of their own wonderfulness, though I suppose, in their defense, those around them seem to play along. [...] Lorelai's downfall is her intense, overwhelming self-absorption. She's chronically rude to people in the service industry, and she is always in the market for special treatment. She is not a good friend to Sookie, even though she thinks she is; she kinda, sorta takes advantage of Sookie's pleaser tendencies and frequently ignores, minimizes, or dismisses Sookie's ideas and problems. Her self-absorption erodes any opportunity for self-awareness. She likes to refer to her "emotional baggage," but she assiduously avoids doing anything about it. Lorelai knows how to push Emily and Richard's buttons, and she never hesitates to do so."

In the fifth season, Lorelai started a relationship with Luke Danes; Sherman-Palladino commented: "I thought we had enough time invested in the relationship that people would care. We had a good four years, and in those four years, we saw Luke go through relationships, and we saw Lorelai go through three relationships. I felt like it was time."

Reception
E! Online's Lia Harberman summarized Lorelai as "a woman we’re dying to call Mom. [...] Finally, the ultratalented actress gets a chance to shine in a show that looks like it just might stick around."
Willa Paskin of PopMatters wrote Lorelai is "perhaps the most fully developed female character on television." The New York Times TV columnist Virginia Heffernan said the character was "painful and surprising and exciting to watch — a marvelous high-wire act." According to Michael Ausiello, fans were reluctant to let Luke and Lorelai go.

In 2005, in honor of Mother's Day, Inside TV, a newly published weekly magazine for television fans, chose its picks for Top 10 All-Time Greatest TV Moms. Gilmore Girls Lorelai Gilmore ranked 5th ahead of classic television mothers Marion Cunningham of Happy Days, Caroline Ingalls from Little House on the Prairie and Carol Brady. of The Brady Bunch. On May 11, 2008, TiVo released the results of a survey conducted by eRewards Market Research on Television's Top Moms. Lorelai ranked 14th, with 20 percent of respondents selecting her among their top 20 TV moms. In the 1000th issue of Entertainment Weekly, Lorelai Gilmore was selected as the Mom for The Perfect TV Family. In 2009, she was voted the "Best Mom" in Zap2it first poll of the best television characters in the 2000s. She was listed in the Top 5 Modern TV Moms by Film.com. In February 2012, Zap2it held a poll to determine TV's Most Crushworthy. Lorelai was elected TV's Most Crushworthy Mom over Gloria Delgado-Pritchett of Modern Family. In May 2012, Lorelai was one of the 13 moms chosen by users of iVillage on their list of "Mommy Dearest: The TV Moms You Love". Lauren Graham was selected twice for her portrayal of Lorelai by the Teen Choice Awards, winning "Choice TV Parental Unit" in 2005 and 2006.

In June 2010, Lorelai was named one of the 100 Greatest Characters of the Last 20 Years along with her daughter Rory by Entertainment Weekly. She was also listed in AfterEllen.com's Top 50 Favorite Female TV Characters. AOL TV ranked her the 57th Most Memorable Female TV Character. Lorelai and Rory were listed in Paste 35 Greatest TV Duos of All Time. Her relationship with Luke was included in TV Guides list of the best TV couples of all time. They were also part of Entertainment Weekly "30 Best 'Will They/Won't They?' TV Couples". AOL TV placed their kisses among the "10 Best Smooches in Television". For her portrayal of Lorelai, Graham received a nomination for the award of Best Actress in a Drama Series at the 2002 Golden Globe Awards, but lost to Jennifer Garner from Alias. She was also nominated for the Screen Actors Guild Award for Outstanding Performance by a Female Actor in a Drama Series in 2000 and in 2001. Several critics felt Graham's performance deserved an Emmy Award nomination; however she never received any, leading Megan Friedman of Time magazine to list her in her "Top 10 Emmy Snubs".

References

External links

Gilmore Girls
Fictional characters from Connecticut
Television characters introduced in 2000
Fictional hoteliers
Fictional maids
Fictional teenage parents
American female characters in television